The 1797 English cricket season was the 26th in which matches have been awarded retrospective first-class cricket status and the 11th after the foundation of the Marylebone Cricket Club. The season saw 13 top-class matches played in the country.

Richard Nyren, who was a pioneer of the game with the Hambledon Club died in April.

Matches 
A total of 13 top-class matches were played during the season, including matches featuring MCC as well as Hampshire and Surrey sides.

Four matches saw the George Finch, 9th Earl of Winchilsea's XI play a side organised by Charles Lennox. In one of these Winchelsea is reported to have attempted to introduce a fourth stump and to increase the height of the stumps by two inches. The following year saw a new version of the Laws of Cricket introduced which raised the height of the stumps but did not introduce a fourth stump.

First mentions
Players who made their first-class cricket debuts in 1797 included:

References

Further reading
 
 
 
 

1797 in English cricket
English cricket seasons in the 18th century